Never Again Action is a Jewish political action organization in the United States that uses civil disobedience and nonviolent methods to protest Immigration and Customs Enforcement (ICE). The organization derives its name from the slogan 'never again' which is often used in reference to the Holocaust.

History

On June 24, 2019, Serena Adlerstein made an informal statement on Facebook about organizing Jews to protest immigrant detention centers in the U.S. Her Facebook network was politically active and soon afterward protests were organized. On June 30, 2019, around 200 people protested at the Elizabeth Contract Detention Center in Elizabeth, New Jersey where police arrested 36 people for blocking exits. In Boston, On July 2, 2019, around 1000 people protested at the Suffolk County House of Corrections after marching from the New England Holocaust Memorial, 18 arrests were made and the state declined to prosecute. On the 4th of July parade in Philadelphia, 33 were arrested for protesting. In July 2019, the organization blocked the doors of the ICE headquarters in Washington, D.C. On July 15, around 100 protested outside the ICE office in Atlanta, Georgia resulting in two arrests. On the 2019 Tisha B'Av holiday, protests were held in more than 50 locations in cities including Washington, D.C., New York, Houston, Salt Lake City, Boston and Baltimore. In New York city, 40 protesters were arrested at an Amazon store for protesting the company's business ties with ICE.

Actions

August 2019 truck attack
On August 14, 2019, several hundred protesters were organized outside of a parking lot by the Donald W. Wyatt Detention Facility in Central Falls, Rhode Island, when an ICE employee drove his pickup truck into the protesters. The incident broke the leg and caused internal bleeding of a 64 year old protester. Immediately afterwards, ICE guards pepper sprayed the protesters and the guard who drove the truck was not detained. On August 15, 2019, the driver of the truck was placed on leave and he resigned the next day. The incident prompted an investigation by the Rhode Island Attorney General.

External links

 Official site

References

Immigrant rights organizations in the United States
Jewish political organizations
Political organizations based in the United States
Articles containing video clips